International School of Law and Business (ISLB,  or TTVAM) is a private university in Vilnius (Laisvės prospektas 58, Viršuliškės), Lithuania. The ISLB has over 700 students with a growing share of international students from 8 different countries and nearly 100 academicians and practitioners. ISLB provides a range of courses taught in English. ISLB has signed over 100 Bilateral Agreements with partner institutions in the frames of LLP/Erasmus programme and Nordplus Framework Programme as well as Master studies in Europe and South Korea.

ISLB was founded on September 1, 1998, as Daugvilienė Business High School (Daugvilienės aukštesnioji verslo mokykla) and 2001 as the Vilnius Law and Business College (Vilniaus teisės ir verslo kolegija). Director was Daiva Daugvilienė.

External links
Official website of ISLB

References

Universities and colleges in Vilnius
Business schools in Lithuania
Educational institutions established in 1998
1998 establishments in Lithuania